Pineapple lumps or pineapple chunks are a chocolate-covered confection with a soft, chewy pineapple-flavoured middle from New Zealand. They are often identified as Kiwiana.

History 

The Regina Confectionery Company in Oamaru introduced pineapple chunks around 1952–54. Charles Diver, the confectionery chief and floor production-manager at Regina who would later formulate other classic Kiwi sweets, had the task of using up waste product from other lollies of the time. One sweet in particular — an early version of the chocolate fish with a pineapple-flavoured marshmallow middle — resulted in the most marshmallow left over, which Diver used to create pineapple chunks. The product's name was changed to pineapple lumps by Regina in the early 1960s to give it a more catchy name.

Cadbury obtained the pineapple lumps name and began manufacturing and selling them under its Pascall brand. In 1995, Regina was bought by Nestlé NZ which shut down the Oamaru factory in 2001. Innovex Holdings purchased the factory from Nestlé, and in June 2001, established Rainbow Confectionery. Rainbow sells pineapple chunks under its own brand and, in 2013, it also released pineapple chunks based on a slightly-modified version of Diver's original recipe under the Regina brand.

Pascall's Pineapple Lumps were the last product manufactured at the Cadbury factory in Dunedin until its closure by Mondelez International in March 2018. Since the sale of all New Zealand-made stock, all Pascall Pineapple Lumps sold in New Zealand have been imported from Australia.

Related products 
, Pams markets a product similar to pineapple chunks using the name "Pineapple Bites".

In 2013, Fonterra released a limited edition Pineapple Lumps-flavoured milk in New Zealand after signing a licensing deal with Cadbury  In 2017, Jaffas Lumps were released in New Zealand by Cadbury for a limited time. In 2019, Cadbury produced a fusion between Perky Nana bars and Pineapple Lumps called Perky Nana Lumps which were released as a limited edition product in New Zealand. In 2019, Cadbury released a limited edition Dairy Milk chocolate block with Pascall Pineapple Lumps inside. Released initially in New Zealand, it was later also released in Australia. In 2020, Cadbury produced a limited edition mashup of Snifters and Pineapple Lumps, known as Snifters Lumps.

References 

New Zealand confectionery
Pineapples
Pascall (company) brands
Mondelez International brands
Products introduced in 1952
Chocolate-covered foods